Fotbal Club Pojorâta, commonly known as FC Pojorâta, or simply as Pojorâta, is a Romanian football club based in Pojorâta, Suceava County founded in 1950.

History

Founded in 1950, Pojorâta played almost all its existence in the Liga IV. In 2013 the team managed to promote to Liga III for the first time in its history. A rebranding operation came along with the promotion, the club changing its name from FC Pojorâta to Bucovina Pojorâta, a tribute to the area where the team originates, Bukovina.

In 2015, the team promoted to Liga II for the first time in its history.

In the summer of 2016, after the relegation from Liga II, the club was dissolved. Then in the summer of 2017, after one year of inactivity, the club was refounded and enrolled in Liga IV – Suceava County.

Honours
Liga III
Winners (1): 2014–15
Liga IV – Suceava County
Winners (1): 2012–13
Runners-up (1): 2018–19
Liga V – Suceava County
Winners (1): 2008–09

Club Officials

Board of directors

Current technical staff

References

External links
 
 FC Pojorâta at Romanian Football Federation
 FC Pojorâta at soccerway.com

Association football clubs established in 1950
Football clubs in Suceava County
Liga II clubs
Liga III clubs
Liga IV clubs
1950 establishments in Romania